Auroop Ratan Ganguly is an American hydrologist, a climate and computational scientist,  and a civil engineer of Indian origin best known for his work at the intersection of climate extremes and water sustainability, infrastructural resilience and homeland security, and artificial intelligence and nonlinear dynamics.

Academics 
Ganguly was born in Mathura, India to Shreemoti Deepali Ganguly (née Bhattacharya) and Shree Nirmal Kumar Ganguly. He completed his primary and secondary schooling from St. Xaviers School, Durgapur, and his higher secondary from Ramakrishna Mission Residential College, Narendrapur (now in Kolkata), both in West Bengal, India. He obtained his Bachelor of Technology in civil engineering from Indian Institute of Technology, Kharagpur (1993), a Master of Science in civil engineering from University of Toledo, Ohio (1997), and a PhD from the Civil and Environmental Engineering Department at the Massachusetts Institute of Technology, Cambridge, Massachusetts (2002).

Professional work 
Ganguly has been a faculty member at Northeastern University (NU) in Boston, United States since 2011. He has a joint appointment as a Chief Scientist at the US DOE's Pacific Northwest National Laboratory in Richland, Washington. He is currently a Professor of Civil and Environmental Engineering, the Director of the Sustainability and Data Sciences Laboratory, one of the two Co-Directors of the Global Resilience Institute (GRI), and a member of the core leadership team of the experiential AI Institute at Northeastern University. He is or has been a Professor by courtesy of multiple departments, schools, centers, institutes, and colleges at NU, specifically, the Khoury College of Computer Science, the School of Public Policy and Urban Affairs, the D'Amore-McKim School of Business, Marine and Environmental Sciences, and Political Science, as well as in the core leadership team of the Experiential Artificial Intelligence (EAI) Institute, and one of two Co-Directors of the Global Resilience Institute.
Ganguly is currently a visiting professor at the Indian Institute of Technology (IIT) Gandhinagar and previously a visiting professor at IIT Kharagpur and IIT Bombay.

Prior to his current position at Northeastern University in Boston, he was at the US Department of Energy's Oak Ridge National Laboratory for seven years in their Computational Sciences and Engineering Division, at Oracle Corporation for five years in their Time Series Database Kernel and Demand Forecasting E-business groups, and at a startup called Demantra Inc., a demand forecasting company subsequently acquired by Oracle, for a year. In addition, he held joint and visiting faculty positions at the University of Tennessee in Knoxville, Tennessee, and the University of South Florida in Tampa, Florida.

Entrepreneurship
Ganguly was a co-founder (with his former PhD student Evan Kodra and another NU alumnus Colin Sullivan) and Chief Scientific Adviser of risQ risQ, a Boston-based climate startup focused on cities, with core capabilities in climate risk assessments for the bond markets and environmental justice. This Northeastern-born startup, a spinout from Ganguly's SDS Lab funded by NSF grants and paying customers (but no VCs), was acquired in January 2022 by the Fortune 500 company Intercontinental Exchange (ICE), whose subsidiaries include the New York Stock Exchange. Currently, Ganguly is an adviser of a startup called Zeus AI, which focuses on AI-based weather forecasting, and was co-founded by his former PhD students Kate Duffy and Thomas Vandal with NASA funding while they were both NASA scientists.

Memberships 
Ganguly is member of United Nations Environmental Program review panel and the lead author of the Artificial Intelligence (AI) section of the 2018 Sustained National Climate Assessment of the United States.  He is also a fellow of the American Society of Civil Engineers and a senior member of the Institute of Electrical and Electronics Engineers (IEEE). He is currently on the editorial board of Nature's Scientific Reports and PLOS One, a Member of the ASCE Technical Committee on Future Weather and Climate Risks, and the Specialty Chief Editor of the Water and Built Environment section  of the journal Frontiers in Water. He was an Associate Editor of the ASCE Journal of Computing in Civil Engineering. He has previously served as an Associate Editor of the American Geophysical Union (AGU) journal Water Resources Research, on the AI committee of the American Meteorological Society (AMS), and as a co-chair of the Societal Dimensions Working Group at the National Center for Atmospheric Research (NCAR). Ganguly is the co-founder and chief scientific adviser at the Cambridge, Massachusetts-based NSF-funded startup risQ.

Research areas
Ganguly's research across the fields on water and climate science, infrastructures resilience and security, as well as machine learning and nonlinear dynamics. He develops fundamental insights about weather extremes and water sustainability, innovative ways to reduce fragility of infrastructures, and new adaptations of data science. Thus, research teams led by him have been among the first to suggest the possibility of persisting cold snaps under global warming, point to growing spatial variability of extreme rainfall during the Indian monsoon, translate scientific understanding of precipitation extremes under climate change to intensity-duration-frequency curves relevant for the design of hydraulic infrastructures, develop efficient recovery strategies for damaged critical lifeline networks, rigorously compare methods to examine nonlinear relations among short and noisy data, develop hybrid physics and data science methods for weather and climate extremes, and new machine learning and network science methods for representing and projecting complex space-time and graphical data. His research informs governments, companies, communities, and people in the broad area of climate adaptation and resilient engineering for urban sustainability and rural development with an emphasis on becoming resilient to changes and extreme events.

Ganguly's research has been cited in United Nations and US assessment reports, highlighted in commentaries in scientific venues such as Nature, PNAS, NASA Tech Briefs, R&D Magazine, US Department of Energy (DOE), and National Science Foundation (NSF) news, while he and his work have been quoted by global media - including by the New York Times, Newsweek, and the Independent (UK) -in the articles on global warming, weather and hydrological disasters, and infrastructure and rebuilding. The startup he cofounded with his former PhD student has been highlighted by the Wall Street Journal.

Books
 Critical Infrastructures Resilience, with Udit Bhatia and Stephen Flynn, Routledge, 2018
 Knowledge Discovery from Sensor Data, Auroop R. Ganguly, Joao Gama, Olufemi A. Omitaomu, Mohamed Gaber, Ranga Raju Vatsavai (editors), CRC Press, 2008

Select publications

References

External links
Dialogue of Civilizations: Climate Change Science and Policy
Sustainability and Data Sciences Laboratory, Northeastern University
risQ
Climate as complex networks
Data stream mining
Nonlinear Processes in Geophysics: Special Issue

Year of birth missing (living people)
Living people
American hydrologists
American people of Indian descent